Nick Pesch (born 25 June 1974) is a former professional Australian rules footballer who played with the Adelaide Football Club and the Melbourne Football Club in the Australian Football League (AFL).

Pesch, who played in the 1993 Woodville-West Torrens SANFL premiership team, made his AFL debut late in the 1994 AFL season and put together regular games in 1995, appearing 15 times. During the 1995 season he kicked four goals in a match against Geelong. A rover, he was traded to Melbourne for Clay Sampson after struggling to have an impact in 1996. After one year at Melbourne, Pesch returned to Woodville-West Torrens and won their 'Best and Fairest' award in 1998. He is a member of the Woodville-West Torrens official 'Team of the Decade', on the interchange bench.

References

External links
 

1974 births
Adelaide Football Club players
Melbourne Football Club players
Woodville-West Torrens Football Club players
Living people
Australian rules footballers from South Australia